José Carlos Serrão (born October 12, 1950) is a Brazilian manager and former football player.

On 27 March 2012, Jose Carlos Serrao having lasted only five games as Gamba Osaka manager, the former Asian champions sacked the Brazilian and replaced him with one of the club's former midfielders, Masanobu Matsunami.

Managerial statistics

Honours

Player 
 São Paulo
 Campeonato Paulista U-20: 1969
 Campeonato Paulista: 1970, 1971 e 1975
 Campeonato Brasileiro Série A: 1977

 Botafogo-PB
 Campeonato Paraibano: 1977

 Joinville
 Campeonato Catarinense: 1978

Manager
 Rio Branco-MG
Minas Gerais Campeonato Mineiro - Módulo II: 1998

References

External links
 Profile at FPF

Footballers from São Paulo
1950 births
Living people
Brazilian footballers
Brazilian football managers
Expatriate footballers in Colombia
Expatriate football managers in Poland
Expatriate football managers in Japan
Campeonato Brasileiro Série A players
Campeonato Brasileiro Série B managers
Categoría Primera A players
São Paulo FC players
Botafogo Futebol Clube (PB) players
Joinville Esporte Clube players
Grêmio Esportivo Juventus players
Esporte Clube Santo André players
Associação Atlética Anapolina players
Cúcuta Deportivo footballers
Esporte Clube Santo André managers
Esporte Clube XV de Novembro (Piracicaba) managers
Associação Atlética Francana managers
Rio Branco de Andradas Futebol Clube managers
Central Sport Club managers
Nacional Atlético Clube (SP) managers
Marília Atlético Clube managers
Clube Atlético Juventus managers
Clube de Regatas Brasil managers
Paysandu Sport Club managers
Londrina Esporte Clube managers
Associação Esportiva Araçatuba managers
Mogi Mirim Esporte Clube managers
Sport Club Corinthians Paulista managers
Ceará Sporting Club managers
Associação Atlética Portuguesa (Santos) managers
Guarani FC managers
União Agrícola Barbarense Futebol Clube managers
Pogoń Szczecin managers
Rio Preto Esporte Clube managers
Associação Atlética Anapolina managers
Sertãozinho Futebol Clube managers
Esporte Clube São Bento managers
América Futebol Clube (SP) managers
J1 League managers
Gamba Osaka managers
Associação Desportiva Recreativa e Cultural Icasa managers
São Carlos Futebol Clube managers
Association football wingers
São Paulo FC non-playing staff